The 2000 CIAU football season began on September 2, 2000, and concluded with the 36th Vanier Cup national championship on December 2 at the SkyDome in Toronto, Ontario, with the Ottawa Gee-Gees winning their second championship. Twenty-four universities across Canada competed in CIAU football this season, the highest level of amateur play in Canadian football, under the auspices of the Canadian Interuniversity Athletics Union (CIAU).

Awards and records

Awards 
 Hec Crighton Trophy – Kojo Aidoo, McMaster
 Presidents' Trophy – Joey Mikawoz, Manitoba
 Russ Jackson Award – Carlo Panaro, Alberta
 J. P. Metras Trophy – Randy Chevrier, McGill
 Peter Gorman Trophy – Jean-Frédéric Tremblay, Laval

All-Canadian team 
 First Team 

 Offence 
 QB Ben Chapdelaine, McMaster
 RB Kojo Aidoo, McMaster
 RB Justin Praamsma, Laurier
 WR Andre Talbot, Laurier
 WR Geoff Drover, Calgary
 IR Ryan Janzen, McMaster
 IR Ben Wearing, McGill
 OT Carlo Panaro, Alberta
 OT Dan Gyetvai, Windsor
 OG Steve Jobin, Concordia
 OG James Hitchen, Laurier
 C Paul Guigna, Waterloo

 Defence 
 DT Randy Chevrier, McGill
 DT Jeremy Oxley, Guelph
 DE Kyl Morrison, Saint Mary's
 DE Pepe Esposito, Laval
 LB Joey Mikawoz, Manitoba
 LB Etienne Vanslette, Laval
 LB Javier Glatt, UBC
 FS Lukas Shaver, Ottawa
 DB Donnie Ruiz, Laurier
 DB Brock Balog, Calgary
 CB Darnell Edwards, Manitoba
 CB Jermaine Romans, Acadia

 Special 
 K Duncan O'Mahony, UBC
 P Michael O'Brien, Western
 Second Team 

 Offence 
 QB Phil Cote, Ottawa
 RB Ben Ouimet, Bishop's
 RB Dean Fisher, Calgary
 WR Michael Linton, McMaster
 WR Jay Currie, Saint Mary's
 IR Jason Clermont, Regina
 IR Patrick Thibeault, Saint Mary's
 IR James MacLean, Queen's
 OT Jon Landon, Queen's
 OT Greg Schaefer, UBC
 OG Eric Pickering, Bishop's
 OG Ryan Donnelly, McMaster
 C Karoly Toth, Saint Mary's
 C Serge Bourque, Bishop's

 Defence 
 DT Doug Borden, Saint Mary's
 DT Aaron Moser, Saskatchewan
 DE Mitch Sutherland, Alberta
 DE Kojo Millington, Laurier
 LB Damian Porter, Windsor
 LB Scott Coe, Manitoba
 LB Sebastian Roy, Mount Allison
 FS Ian Schafer, Calgary
 FS Kevin Taylor, Laurier
 DB Loan Duong, Concordia
 DB Denis Arruba, Saint Mary's
 DB Shane Sharpe, Alberta
 CB Greg Bourne, Waterloo
 CB Frantz Jacques, Ottawa

 Special 
 K Michael O'Brien, Western
 P Duncan O'Mahony, UBC

Results

Regular season standings 
Note: GP = Games Played, W = Wins, L = Losses, OTL = Overtime Losses, PF = Points For, PA = Points Against, Pts = Points

Teams in bold have earned playoff berths.

Top 10 

Ranks in italics are teams not ranked in the top 10 poll but received votes.
NR = Not Ranked. Source:

Championships 
The Vanier Cup is played between the champions of the Atlantic Bowl and the Churchill Bowl, the national semi-final games. This year, the Dunsmore Cup Ontario-Quebec champion visited the Ontario conference's Yates Cup championship team for the Churchill Bowl. The winners of the Atlantic conference Loney Bowl championship hosted the winners of the Canada West conference Hardy Trophy for the Atlantic Bowl.

Vanier Cup

Notes 

U Sports football seasons
CIS football season